Tobias Törnkvist  (born April 14, 1994) is a Swedish ice hockey player. He is currently playing with Rögle BK of the Swedish Hockey League (SHL).

Törnkvist made his Elitserien (now the SHL) debut playing with Rögle BK during the 2012–13 Elitserien season.

References

External links

1994 births
Living people
Swedish ice hockey right wingers
Rögle BK players
Sportspeople from Helsingborg